The 2005 Tro-Bro Léon was the 22nd edition of the Tro-Bro Léon cycle race and was held on 17 April 2005. The race was won by Tristan Valentin.

General classification

References

2005
2005 in road cycling
2005 in French sport
April 2005 sports events in France